Rigoberto Fontt (15 December 1925 – 1979) was a Chilean sports shooter. He competed in the 50 metre pistol event at the 1956 Summer Olympics. Fontt later became the mayor of Colina, Chile, with a secondary school being named after him.

References

External links
 

1925 births
1979 deaths
Chilean male sport shooters
Olympic shooters of Chile
Shooters at the 1956 Summer Olympics
Place of birth missing
20th-century Chilean people